YSR Rythu Bharosa is a program launched by the Government of Andhra Pradesh to financially assist farmers by depositing an amount of ₹13,500 per annum in three installments, in association with Pradhan Mantri Kisan Samman Nidhi with the state government contributing ₹7500 and the center ₹6000.

Development 
YSR Rythu Bharosa was launched by Chief minister of Andhra Pradesh Y. S. Jagan Mohan Reddy on 15 October 2019 releasing ₹3785 crore benefiting 38 lakh farmers in the state. Rythu Bharosa Kendras were later launched on 30 May 2020 to supply seedlings, fertilizers and seeds to horticulture, aquaculture and agriculture sectors. A total amount of ₹6,173 crore was spent on the scheme for the year 2019-20 and ₹6,928 core for 2020-21.

The scheme 
Under YSR Rythu Bharosa-PM Kisan scheme, farmers get a financial assistance of ₹13,500 per annum where the state government contributes ₹7,500 and ₹6.000 is contributed by the Government of India.

Tenant farmers were also considered eligible to the scheme.

References 

2019 establishments in Andhra Pradesh
Agriculture in Andhra Pradesh
Government welfare schemes in Andhra Pradesh